Jonathan Valois (born February 7, 1971 in Sorel-Tracy, Quebec) is a politician from Quebec, Canada, and the former Member of the National Assembly for the electoral district of Joliette.

He was elected in the 2003 Quebec general election but declined to run for re-election in 2007.

He was a former participant in the Quebec student's parliament and leader of the youth organization of the Parti Québécois.

He served as president of the Parti Québécois from February 22, 2009 until 2011.

References 
 

1971 births
Living people
People from Sorel-Tracy
Parti Québécois MNAs
Canadian political party presidents
21st-century Canadian politicians